The Family Restaurant is a Canadian reality television series, which aired on Food Network Canada between 2005 and 2009.

Profiling family-owned restaurants in the Edmonton, Alberta area, the show's first two seasons focused on the Psalios family chain of Greek restaurants, while its third and final season focused on the Quon family chain of Chinese restaurants. The Quon family were later featured in their own spinoff series, The Quon Dynasty, on Citytv.

The series was produced by Anaid Productions and distributed by Picture Box Distribution. The Quon family season was also carried by WE tv in the United States in 2011.

References

External links

Food Network (Canadian TV channel) original programming
2005 Canadian television series debuts
2009 Canadian television series endings
Television shows filmed in Edmonton
2000s Canadian reality television series